Peter Dean Martin (1923 – March 3, 1988) was a college professor and bookstore owner, known for his founding of the City Lights Bookstore. He was the son of Carlo Tresca and Sabina 'Bina' Flynn, and the nephew of Elizabeth Gurley Flynn.

Background
Martin was teaching sociology at San Francisco State College when in 1953 he founded the short lived City Lights Publishing company. To support the publishing company he started the City Lights Pocket Book Shop with Lawrence Ferlinghetti.

After two years, he sold his interest in the bookstore and returned to his native New York, where he founded the New Yorker Bookstore.

References

1923 births
1988 deaths
American booksellers
San Francisco State University faculty